James M. Harris is an American businessman, who, along with Rod Canion and Bill Murto, founded Compaq Computer Corporation. He resigned from the company in 1991.

References

Living people
Compaq
Texas Instruments people
Year of birth missing (living people)